In mathematics, the matrix representation of conic sections permits the tools of linear algebra to be used in the study of conic sections. It provides easy ways to calculate a conic section's axis, vertices, tangents and the pole and polar relationship between points and lines of the plane determined by the conic. The technique does not require putting the equation of a conic section into a standard form, thus making it easier to investigate those conic sections whose axes are not parallel to the coordinate system.

Conic sections (including degenerate ones) are the sets of points whose coordinates satisfy a second-degree polynomial equation in two variables,

By an abuse of notation, this conic section will also be called  when no confusion can arise.

This equation can be written in matrix notation, in terms of a symmetric matrix to simplify some subsequent formulae, as

The sum of the first three terms of this equation, namely

is the quadratic form associated with the equation, and the matrix

is called the matrix of the quadratic form.

The quadratic equation can also be written as

where  is the homogeneous coordinate vector in three variables restricted so that the last variable is 1, i.e.,

and where  is the matrix

The matrix  is called the matrix of the quadratic equation.

The above notation  is used in this article to emphasize this relationship.

Classification 

Proper (non-degenerate) and degenerate conic sections can be distinguished based on the determinant of :

If , the conic is degenerate.

If  so that  is not degenerate, we can see what type of conic section it is by computing the minor, :

  is a hyperbola if and only if ,
  is a parabola if and only if , and
  is an ellipse if and only if .

If the conic section is degenerate,  still allows us to distinguish its form:

 Two intersecting lines (a hyperbola degenerated to its two asymptotes) if and only if .
 Two parallel straight lines (a degenerate parabola) if and only if . These lines are distinct and real if , coincident if , and non-existent in the real plane if .
 A single point (a degenerate ellipse) if and only if .

The case of coincident lines occurs if and only if the rank of the 3 × 3 matrix  is 1; in all other degenerate cases its rank is 2.

Central conics 
When  a geometric center of the conic section exists and such conic sections (ellipses and hyperbolas) are called central conics.

Center
The center of a conic, if it exists, is a point that bisects all the chords of the conic that pass through it. This property can be used to calculate the coordinates of the center, which can be shown to be the point where the gradient of the quadratic function  vanishes—that is,

This yields the center as given below.

An alternative approach that uses the matrix form of the quadratic equation is based on the fact that when the center is the origin of the coordinate system, there are no linear terms in the equation. Any translation to a coordinate origin , using ,  gives rise to

This condition produces the coordinates of the center:

This calculation can also be accomplished by taking the first two rows of the associated 

This yields the above center point.

In the case of a parabola, that is, when , there is no center since the above denominators become zero (or, interpreted projectively, the center is on the line at infinity.)

Centered matrix equation

A central (non-parabola) conic  can be rewritten in centered matrix form as

where

Standard form of a central conic

The standard form of the equation of a central conic section is obtained when the conic section is translated and rotated so that its center lies at the center of the coordinate system and its axes coincide with the coordinate axes. This is equivalent to saying that the coordinate system's center is moved and the coordinate axes are rotated to satisfy these properties. In the diagram, the original -coordinate system with origin  is moved to the -coordinate system with origin .

The translation is by the vector 

The rotation by angle  can be carried out by diagonalizing the matrix .

Dividing by  we obtain a standard canonical form.

For example, for an ellipse this form is

For central conics, both eigenvalues are non-zero and the classification of the conic sections can be obtained by examining them. 
 If  and  have the same algebraic sign, then  is a real ellipse, imaginary ellipse or real point if  has the same sign, has the opposite sign or is zero, respectively.
 If  and  have opposite algebraic signs, then  is a hyperbola or two intersecting lines depending on whether  is nonzero or zero, respectively.

Axes 

By the principal axis theorem, the two eigenvectors of the matrix of the quadratic form of a central conic section (ellipse or hyperbola) are perpendicular (orthogonal to each other) and each is parallel to (in the same direction as) either the major or minor axis of the conic. The eigenvector having the smallest eigenvalue (in absolute value) corresponds to the major axis.

Vertices 

The vertices of a central conic can be determined by calculating the intersections of the conic and its axes — in other words, by solving the system consisting of the quadratic conic equation and the linear equation for alternately one or the other of the axes. Two or no vertices are obtained for each axis, since, in the case of the hyperbola, the minor axis does not intersect the hyperbola at a point with real coordinates. However, from the broader view of the complex plane, the minor axis of an hyperbola does intersect the hyperbola, but at points with complex coordinates.

Poles and polars

Using homogeneous coordinates, the points
 and 
are conjugate with respect to the conic  provided

The conjugates of a fixed point  either form a line or consist of all the points in the plane of the conic. This relationship between points and lines is called a polarity.

If the conic is non-degenerate, the conjugates of a point always form a line and the polarity defined by the conic is a bijection between the points and lines of the extended plane containing the conic (that is, the plane together with the points and line at infinity).

The equation, in homogeneous coordinates, of the polar line of the point  with respect to the non-degenerate conic  is given by

Just as  uniquely determines its polar line (with respect to a given conic), so each line determines a unique pole . Furthermore, a point  is on a line  which is the polar of a point , if and only if the polar of  passes through the point  (La Hire's theorem). Thus, this relationship is an expression of geometric duality between points and lines in the plane.

Several familiar concepts concerning conic sections are directly related to this polarity. The center of a non-degenerate conic can be identified as the pole of the line at infinity. A parabola, being tangent to the line at infinity, would have its center being a point on the line at infinity. Hyperbolas intersect the line at infinity in two distinct points and the polar lines of these points are the asymptotes of the hyperbola and are the tangent lines to the hyperbola at these points of infinity. Also, the polar line of a focus of the conic is its corresponding directrix.

Tangents 

Let line  be the polar line of point  with respect to the non-degenerate conic . Finally, if  does not intersect  then  has no tangent lines passing through it and it is called an interior or inner point.

The equation of the tangent line (in homogeneous coordinates) at a point  on the non-degenerate conic  is given by,

Using the theory of poles and polars, the problem of finding the four mutual tangents of two conics reduces to finding the intersection of two conics.

See also 
 Conic section#General Cartesian form
 Quadratic form (statistics)

Notes

References
 
 
 
 
 
 

Conic sections